Lif  Island is a small island of the Tanga Islands of Papua New Guinea, located to the east of New Ireland. It is located to the south-west of Malendok Island and north of Tefa Island. The main settlements are Balamfal and Kitkita.

References

Islands of Papua New Guinea